Nicholas Kolcheff (born November 21, 1990), better known as Nickmercs (stylized in all caps), is an American Twitch streamer, YouTuber and co-owner of FaZe Clan who plays Fortnite Battle Royale, Call of Duty: Warzone and Apex Legends.

Career
Kolcheff is from Detroit, Michigan. He first built his name as a Gears of War professional in the late 2000s. He won the Gears of War 2 National Championship in 2009. He also played Halo professionally. During this time he had multiple confrontations with Ninja due to trash talking. 

He started streaming on Justin.tv in 2010. He used his success in Gears of War to build a following. He created his YouTube channel in 2011 and made videos of Call of Duty and later Outlast. In 2018, Kolcheff joined Matthew "Nadeshot" Haag's organization 100 Thieves as a content creator. Kolcheff's channel consistently streamed to 5000+ viewers daily and his stream popped off when his squad broke the world record for total kills in Fortnite with 54, the record was later broken by xPolitics, MannyinCali, TozSlays, and JuicyMutt with 59 kills. Kolcheff won the first Fortnite Friday with SypherPK and earned $2,500.

Kolcheff is known for his aggressive play style, genius movement and domination in close quarters combat. He has earned over $130,000 in Fortnite prizes. Kolcheff developed an early rivalry with fellow streamer, Aydan, due to both being controller players. They are no longer rivals and often team with each other.

In May 2019, Kolcheff had a falling out and split from 100 Thieves citing failed promises and poor management. He joined FaZe Clan later that month.

Despite offers from rival streaming services, Kolcheff said he would stay with Twitch. Kolcheff has garnered upwards of 70,000 viewers on Twitch. He is estimated to have earned $6 million in 2019 and was the 10th highest earning gamer that year.

Nick is known in the gaming community as the leader of the MFAM, one of the most close knit gaming communities. He often gives back to his community through giveaways, supporting smaller streamers and putting together the MFAM bar-b-que, a free event for the MFAM members and their families. The BBQ features an array of games, food, and giveaways.

Personal life
On July 8, 2019, Kolcheff proposed to his longtime girlfriend Emumita Bonita on stream. They later married on October 10, 2020.

Awards and nominations

See also 
 List of most-followed Twitch channels

References

External links 
 

1990 births
American esports players
Living people
Call of Duty players
Fortnite
Twitch (service) streamers
Sportspeople from Detroit
FaZe Clan players